Paul Viloria (born ) is a Venezuelan male volleyball player. He is part of the Venezuela men's national volleyball team. On club level he plays for Distrito Capital.

References

External links
 profile at FIVB.org

1995 births
Living people
Venezuelan men's volleyball players
Place of birth missing (living people)